Yami Qaghan ( Jаmï qağan; Chinese: 啓民可汗, 啟民可汗/启民可汗; Pinyin: Qǐmín Kěhàn, Wade-Giles: Ch'i-min K'o-han, Middle Chinese (Guangyun)), personal name Ashina Rangan (阿史那染幹/阿史那染干, pinyin Āshǐnà rǎngān; Wade-Giles A-shih-na jan-kan), at one point known as Tolis Qaghan (突利可汗, Töles qaγan) and later El Ïduk Jamï(r) Qağan (意利珍豆啟民可汗/意利珍豆启民可汗, Yìlì Zhēndòu Qǐmín Kěhàn) was the first qaghan of the Eastern Turkic Khaganate.

Background 
His parentage is uncertain as he was either son of Bagha Qaghan or Ishbara Qaghan. He was a subordinate khagan under Tulan Qaghan with title of Tolis Qaghan, ruling eastern tribes.

He sent an ambassador to Sui dynasty in 597, requesting to marry to a Chinese princess. Pei Ju saw this as opportunity and told him to kill Tulan Qaghan's Zhou origin khatun Princess Qianjin (who was styled as Princess Dayi by Sui dynasty). Princess was murdered and emperor fulfilled his promise, sending Princess Anyi (安义公主) to marry him.

However, Tolis' ambitious behaviour caused outrage to khagan. Tulan started to gather invasion party to attack Sui repeatedly in 597 and 599, only to be reported to emperor beforehand by Tolis every occasion. As a reaction, Tulan approached to Tardu to combine forces and attack Tolis. Attack was a success and Tolis had to flee to China after his brothers and nephews getting killed during invasion.

In winter 599, he was created Qimin Khagan by Emperor Wen. Meanwhile Princess Anyi died and he was married to Princess Yicheng this time, a daughter of Yang Xie (杨谐). Emperor also commissioned Zhangsun Sheng to build the city of Dali (大利, in modern Hohhot) to house Qimin's people, and also sent an army to protect Qimin.

Meanwhile Tulan was killed by his men causing Tardu to assume throne and claim title Bilge Khagan in 599/600.

In winter 601, Emperor Wen commissioned Yang Su to command an army, in association with Qimin Khan as to attack Tardu.

Reign 
After Tardu's subsequent defeat in 603, he fled to Tuyuhun. Having a cleared way Qimin assumed Turkic throne, definitely starting division between Western and Eastern wings of khaganate.

In spring 607, he went to Luoyang to pay a visit to Emperor Yang. In the summer, he was visited back by Yang. Khagan's display of submission and loyalty caused Emperor Yang to bestow much honor and wealth on him. When the senior officials Gao Jiong, Yuwen Bi (宇文弼), and Heruo Bi privately expressed disapproval, Emperor Yang discovered their criticism and put all of them to death, while removing Su Wei, who also discouraged him from giving excessive rewards to khagan, from his post.

In spring 609, Qimin made another visit to Emperor Yang and was rewarded with much treasure. He died later from an illness.

Family 
He was married to Princess Anyi (安义公主) at first and later her death to Princess Yicheng (義成公主). He also had a Tuyuhun concubine or wife. He had several issues:
 Shibi Qaghan
 Chuluo Qaghan
 Illig Qaghan
 Yento shad (延陀設)
 Chiji shad (叱吉設)
 Börü shad (步利設)

Notes

References

Sources 
Book of Sui, vol. 84.
History of the Northern Dynasties, vol. 99.
Zizhi Tongjian vols 179, 180, 181.

6th-century births
609 deaths
Göktürk khagans
Ashina house of the Turkic Empire
7th-century Turkic people
Founding monarchs